Knox County is a county located in the U.S. state of Ohio. As of the 2020 census, the population was 62,721. Its county seat is Mount Vernon. The county is named for Henry Knox, an officer in the American Revolutionary War who was later the first Secretary of War. Knox County comprises the Mount Vernon, OH Micropolitan Statistical Area, which is also included in the Columbus-Marion-Zanesville, OH Combined Statistical Area.

History

Knox County was formed from Fairfield County in 1808.

Geography
Approximately 58% of the county is farmland and 28% is forested. Most of the county lies in the Glaciated Allegheny Plateau with rolling hills and valleys. Although the relief is not sharp, some elevations in the county reach over 1400 feet above sea level.

Adjacent counties
 Richland County (north)
 Ashland County (far northeast)
 Holmes County (northeast)
 Coshocton County (east)
 Licking County (south)
 Delaware County (southwest)
 Morrow County (northwest)

Demographics

2000 census
In Knox county, the 2000 census reported that the number of same-sex couples was 91 and the percent of same-sex couples out of all households was 0.46%.

As of the census of 2010, there were 60,921 people, 22,607 households, and 15,693 families living in the county. There were 24,997 housing units. The racial makeup of the county was 96.7% White, 0.8% Black or African American, 0.2% Native American, 0.6% Asian, 0.03% Pacific Islander, 0.4% from other races, and 1.2% from two or more races. 1.2% of the population were Hispanic or Latino of any race.

There were 22,607 households, out of which 29.5% had children under the age of 18 living with them, 55.2% were married couples living together, 9.7% had a female householder with no husband present, and 30.6% were non-families. 25.7% of all households were made up of individuals, and 27.4% had someone living alone who was 65 years of age or older. The average household size was 2.54 and the average family size was 3.04.

In the county, the population was spread out, with 28.0% under the age of 20, 7.9% from 20 to 24, 22.5% from 25 to 44, 27.0% from 45 to 64, and 14.8% who were 65 years of age or older. The median age was 38.3 years. For every 100 females there were 94.70 males. For every 100 females, there were 95.4 males.

The median income for a household in the county was $48,734, and the median income for a family was $50,034. The per capita income for the county was $22,628. About 9.4% of families and 13.0% of the population were below the poverty line, including 19.2% of those under age 18 and 8.3% of those age 65 or over.

2010 census
As of the 2010 United States Census, there were 60,921 people, 22,607 households, and 15,693 families living in the county. The racial makeup of the county was 96.7% white, 0.8% black or African American, 0.6% Asian, 0.2% American Indian, 0.4% from other races, and 1.2% from two or more races. Those of Hispanic or Latino origin made up 1.2% of the population. In terms of ancestry, 30.5% were German, 14.4% were Irish, 13.9% were English, and 9.2% were American.

Of the 22,607 households, 32.4% had children under the age of 18 living with them, 55.2% were married couples living together, 9.7% had a female householder with no husband present, 30.6% were non-families, and 25.7% of all households were made up of individuals. The average household size was 2.54 and the average family size was 3.04. The median age was 38.3 years.

The median income for a household in the county was $45,655 and the median income for a family was $55,881. Males had a median income of $41,762 versus $30,836 for females. The per capita income for the county was $21,204. About 9.1% of families and 13.1% of the population were below the poverty line, including 18.8% of those under age 18 and 9.5% of those age 65 or over.

Politics
Knox County is a Republican stronghold county in presidential elections. The last time it supported Democrats was for Lyndon B. Johnson in 1964.

|}

Government

County Commissioners
 Theresa Bemiller, Republican
 Bill Pursel, Republican 
 Thom Collier, Republican

State Senate
 Andrew Brenner, Republican, Ohio's 19th Senatorial District

State Representative
 Rick Carfagna, Republican, Ohio's 68th Representative District

United States House of Representatives
 Troy Balderson, Republican, Ohio's 12th congressional district

United States Senators
 Sherrod Brown, Democrat, Ohio
 J. D. Vance, Republican, Ohio

Economy
A large portion of Knox County's economy is based on agriculture, with gross cash receipts for crops and livestock at $110 million for 2011. Corn is the primary crop, followed by soybeans and livestock. Mount Vernon, the county seat, is home to major employers in the county, Siemens Energy Inc. (formerly Rolls-Royce Energy Systems, Inc. and Cooper Industries before that) and Ariel Corporation, both of which are manufacturers of components used in the natural gas industry. Major employers in the county also include Kenyon College located in Gambier, Mount Vernon Nazarene University in Mount Vernon, and the Kokosing Construction Company near Fredericktown.

Education
 Kenyon College
 Mount Vernon Nazarene University
 Central Ohio Technical College

Communities

City
 Mount Vernon (county seat)

Villages
 Centerburg
 Danville
 Fredericktown
 Gambier
 Gann
 Martinsburg
 Utica

Townships

 Berlin
 Brown
 Butler
 Clay
 Clinton
 College
 Harrison
 Hilliar
 Howard
 Jackson
 Jefferson
 Liberty
 Middlebury
 Milford
 Miller
 Monroe
 Morgan
 Morris
 Pike
 Pleasant
 Union
 Wayne

Census-designated places
 Apple Valley
 Bladensburg
 Howard
 South Mount Vernon

Unincorporated communities

 Amity
 Ankenytown
 Artanna
 Bangs
 Batemantown
 Brandon
 Five Corners
 Green Valley
 Greer
 Hunt
 Jelloway
 Knox
 Lock
 Lucerne
 Millwood
 Monroe Mills
 Morgan Center
 Mt. Liberty
 North Liberty
 Palmyra
 Pipesville
 Rich Hill
 Rossville
 Waterford
 Zuck

Notable residents
 Thomas Peter Akers, United States Congressman
 Dan Emmett, songwriter of "Dixie"
 George Hunt, Illinois Attorney General
 Paul Lynde, actor (Bewitched, Hollywood Squares)
 Luke Perry, American Actor

See also
 National Register of Historic Places listings in Knox County, Ohio

References

External links
 Knox County Government
 Knox County Sheriff's Office

 
1808 establishments in Ohio